Wreckreation Nation is a travel/reality television show on the Discovery Channel, highlighting unusual recreational activities and amateur competitions across the United States. It is hosted by Dave Mordal.

The show debuted on January 6, 2009.

Episodes

References

External links
Official website

Discovery Channel original programming
2000s American reality television series
2009 American television series debuts
2009 American television series endings